Thomas Hainey Jr. (born November 6, 1965) is a Canadian retired Paralympic athlete from Atikokan, Ontario. He competed in swimming events, winning four gold and five silver medals. Hainey currently serves as community services manager for his home town.

References

Living people
1960s births
Medalists at the 1984 Summer Paralympics
Medalists at the 1988 Summer Paralympics
Paralympic medalists in swimming
Paralympic gold medalists for Canada
Paralympic silver medalists for Canada
Swimmers at the 1984 Summer Paralympics
Swimmers at the 1988 Summer Paralympics
Paralympic swimmers of Canada
Canadian male freestyle swimmers
Canadian male breaststroke swimmers
Canadian male medley swimmers
Canadian Disability Hall of Fame